Héctor Font Romero (born 15 June 1984) is a Spanish professional footballer who plays as an attacking midfielder.

He played 274 professional league matches in his career, split nearly exactly between La Liga and Segunda División, representing Villarreal, Osasuna and Valladolid in the former competition and seven teams in the latter.

Club career
Born in Villarreal, Castellón, Valencian Community, Font started his career with hometown's Villarreal CF and appeared for the first team in the last two La Liga games in 2002–03, against RCD Espanyol and Real Betis. He spent the following season in the second division, on loan to Ciudad de Murcia.

Subsequently, Font returned to Villarreal where, although never an automatic starter, he managed to appear regularly. On 24 October 2004, he scored twice in a 4–0 home win against CD Numancia; In the European front, he made 11 appearances (two goals) in the UEFA Cup as they reached the last eight, adding four matches in next campaign's UEFA Champions League for an eventual place in the semi-finals.

Surplus to requirements at Villarreal, Font joined CA Osasuna in July 2006. He made his official debut for the Navarrese club on 9 September in a 0–3 loss at FC Barcelona, and would become first-choice in his second year, scoring in 3–1 home victories over RCD Mallorca and Atlético Madrid.

In the second half of 2008–09, with the arrival of a new coach José Antonio Camacho, Font was used sparingly. In late June 2009, the free agent moved to Real Valladolid on a three-year contract. He only totaled 358 minutes of action in his first and only season, and the Castile and León team was also relegated from the top flight.

Font continued playing in the second level in the following years, with Xerez CD, Recreativo de Huelva, FC Cartagena, CD Lugo and Hércules CF. In July 2014, he dropped down to the third level and signed for Real Oviedo, playing 35 games in his first season as they won the title. After a second campaign curtailed by a knee injury, he was released from the team.

Honours
Villarreal
UEFA Intertoto Cup: 2003, 2004

Oviedo
Segunda División B: 2014–15

References

External links

1984 births
Living people
People from Villarreal
Sportspeople from the Province of Castellón
Spanish footballers
Footballers from the Valencian Community
Association football midfielders
La Liga players
Segunda División players
Segunda División B players
Divisiones Regionales de Fútbol players
Villarreal CF players
Ciudad de Murcia footballers
CA Osasuna players
Real Valladolid players
Xerez CD footballers
Recreativo de Huelva players
FC Cartagena footballers
CD Lugo players
Hércules CF players
Real Oviedo players
Spain youth international footballers
Spain under-21 international footballers